Twillingate Islands (French "Toulinguet") are a group of islands in Notre Dame Bay of the Island of Newfoundland in the province of Newfoundland and Labrador, Canada. There are two main islands, North Twillingate Island and South Twillingate Island, and several smaller islands that lie close to those; the largest is Burnt Island. 
The southern island is connected to New World Island via the Walter B. Elliott Causeway. The northern island is connected to the southern island by Tickle Bridge, which runs along Main Street in the town.  The actual town of Twillingate is located on both islands.

The original French name of these islands is 'Toulinguet', which was chosen by French fishermen as the landscape reminded them of the one of western Brittany, such as on Pointe du Toulinguet.

The communities on the northern Twillingate island are:
 Crow Head
 Wild Cove
 Back Harbour

The communities on the southern Twillingate island are:
 Durrell
 Bayview
 Little Harbour
 Purcell's Harbour
 Kettle Cove
 Black Duck Cove

See also
 Geography of Newfoundland and Labrador

Islands of Newfoundland and Labrador